Callao is one of the seven districts of the Constitutional Province of Callao in the Callao Region, Peru. The Chillón River marks the district's northern border with Ventanilla. On the east, the Callao district is bordered by the Carmen de la Legua-Reynoso as well as the Lima Province's districts of San Martín de Porres and Lima. The Bellavista and the La Perla districts are located to the southeast, while La Punta borders the district on the west. The Pacific Ocean borders the province on the west and south. At 1956, it expanded to the north, encompassing latifunds, lands and estates that belonged to the San Martín de Porres District and the Carabayllo district. During this expansion, the Jorge Chávez International Airport is built.

Since Jorge Chávez International Airport as well as Peru's main seaport are located in this district, Callao is the largest port of entry to Peru.

The city of Callao forms a conurbation with Lima and thus, the district is economically, socially and culturally integrated with this city. (See: Lima and Callao Metropolitan Area).

References

External links
 Todo Callao (in Spanish)

Districts of the Callao Region
Central business districts